Alice is a South Korean television series starring Kim Hee-sun and Joo Won. It aired on SBS from August 28 to October 24, 2020, every Friday and Saturday at 22:00 (KST).  It is described as "a human sci-fi drama about a magical time travel of a woman who resembles a dead woman and a man who lost his emotions". It was made available on Netflix.

Synopsis
In the year 2050, Alice (temporal agency) specializes in sending clients back through time to see dead loved ones to find peace and closure; they also police time incursions. Alice agents Yoon Tae-yi (Kim Hee-sun) and Yoo Min-hyuk (Kwak Si-yang) travelled to the year 1992 Seoul to search for The Book of Prophecy (a book that predicts the fates of certain people and end of time travel) and found it. However, Lee Se-hoon (Park In-soo), agent of the mysterious Teacher (rogue group that wants to continue manipulating time), found the young Tae-yi and murdered her father for the book. Before her father died, he gave the final page to little Tae-yi before her adult counterpart arrived. Tae-yi and Min-hyuk acquired the book and had local police arrest Se-hoon. When Tae-yi realized she was pregnant, Min-hyuk (the father) encouraged Tae-yi to abort the child as time traveling (radiation) would cause serious defects. Tae-yi then disappeared with the book to carry her child.

Tae-yi would rename herself as Park Sun-young and single-handedly raised her son, Park Jin-gyeom (Joo Won). Born with Alexithymia, he has difficulty recognizing his own emotions and his classmates called him a psychopath. He unknowingly has the ability to manipulate time in life-and-death situations. In 2010, Jin-gyeom found his mother murdered and vowed to find her killer. Orphaned without a family, Detective Go Hyeon-seok (Kim Sang-ho) and classmate Kim Do-yeon (Lee Da-in) looked after him. By 2020, Jin-gyeom becomes a detective under Hyeon-seok and learns about time travelers, Alice, the Teacher, and the truth behind his mother's death.

Cast

Main
 Kim Hee-sun as Yoon Tae-yi / Park Sun-young
Kim Ji-yu as young Tae-yi
 Park Sun-young is a woman with a mysterious past who lives with her son. She died in a mysterious circumstance and left a eerie instruction to her son. Yoon Tae-yi is a genius physicist who has a striking resemblance to Park Sun-young. She encounters Park Jin-gyeom due to a mysterious case and decides to help him uncover the truth.
 Joo Won as Park Jin-gyeom
 Moon Joo-won as child Park Jin-gyeom (Ep. 1)
 Moon Woo-jin as young Park Jin-gyeom (Ep. 1, 7)
 Park Jin-gyeom was born without the ability to feel or express emotions. He was raised by his single mother who was the only person he cared about. He becomes a detective with the help of Go Hyeon-seok. While investigating mysterious cases, he stumbles upon time travelers.

Supporting
 Kwak Si-yang as Yoo Min-hyuk
 A passionate agent of Alice and time traveler, Yoo Min-hyuk gave up the most important person in his life for Alice. He is very skilled and does his job proficiently. He faces trouble with the police when one of his clients decides to break an important time-traveling rule.
 Lee Da-in as Kim Do-yeon
 Park Jin-gyeom's only friend, Kim Do-yeon, is a reporter for Sekyung Ilbo News and has a crush on Jin-gyeom since high school. She is investigating a mysterious case involving strange drones.
 Kim Sang-ho as Go Hyeon-seok
 A senior detective and team leader of the investigation team. He was in charge of Park Sun-young's murder case. He and his wife took care of Park Jin-gyeom after his mother died.
 Choi Won-young as Seok Oh-won
Director of Kuiper Institute of Advanced Science

People at the Police Station
 Lee Jae-yoon as Kim Dong-ho
 Jung Wook as Ha Yong-seok
 Jihyuk as Hong Jeong-wook
 Choi Hong-il as Yoon Jong-soo

Alice staff
 Kim Kyung-nam as Ki Cheol-am
 Hwang Seung-eon as Oh Shi-young
 Yang Ji-il as Choi Seung-pyo
 Nam Kyung as Jung Hye-soo

People around Yoon Tae-yi
 Choi Jung-woo as Tae-yi's father
 Oh Young-sil as Tae-yi's mother
 Yeonwoo as Yoon Tae-yeon, Tae-yi's younger sister

Others
Bae Hae-sun as Kim In-sook, Go Hyeon-seok's wife
 Min Jun-ho as Kim Jung-bae, senior reporter of Sekyung Ilbo News
 Oh Se-young as Si-young
 Lee Su-woong as Jung Ki-hoon, a broker that helps time travelers stay illegally
 Yoon Joo-man as Joo Hae-min, a serial killer from the future

Special appearances 
 Jang Hyun-sung as Professor Jang Dong-shik (Ep. 1)
 Park In-soo as Lee Se-hoon, a time traveler who murdered Professor Jang (Ep. 1, 6)
 Oh Yeon-ah as Han Sun-hee, Hong Eun-soo's mother and a time traveler (Ep. 1–4)
 Seo Yi-soo as Hong Eun-soo (Ep. 1–4)
 Lee Seung-hyung as Hong Suk-joon, Hong Eun-soo's father (Ep. 1, 3–4)
 Lee Jung-hyun as Yang Hong-seob, a time traveler who breaks an important rule of Alice (Ep. 2)

Production
This is the first acting role of actor Joo Won since he was discharged from his mandatory military service on February 5, 2019.

On July 31, 2020, SBS released photos from the first script reading of the series attended by the cast and crew of the show.

Original soundtrack

Part 1

Part 2

Viewership

Awards and nominations

Notes

References

External links
  
 
 

Seoul Broadcasting System television dramas
Korean-language television shows
2020 South Korean television series debuts
2020 South Korean television series endings
South Korean time travel television series
South Korean science fiction television series
Television series by Studio S
Wavve original programming